The Harney River is a river in Monroe County, Florida.

History
Harney river was named after Colonel William S. Harney.

References

Bodies of water of Monroe County, Florida
Rivers of Florida